Totally Hits 2 is an album in the Totally Hits series. The album contains three Billboard Hot 100 number-one hits: "Maria Maria", "Genie in a Bottle", and "Amazed".

Track listing
Santana featuring The Product G&B – "Maria Maria" 4:07 
Christina Aguilera – "Genie in a Bottle" 3:38 
Third Eye Blind – "Never Let You Go" 3:58 
Sugar Ray – "Falls Apart" 4:17 
Lonestar – "Amazed" 4:02 
Lou Bega – "Mambo No. 5 (A Little Bit of...)" 3:40 
Madonna – "Beautiful Stranger" 4:22 
Whitney Houston – "My Love Is Your Love" (Jonathan Peters Radio Mix) 4:32 
Filter – "Take a Picture" 4:22 
TLC – "Dear Lie" 4:39 
Missy Elliott – "Hot Boyz" 3:31 
Moby – "Natural Blues" 3:02 
LFO – "Girl on TV" 4:09 
NSYNC – "Thinking of You (I Drive Myself Crazy)" 3:59 
Donell Jones – "U Know What's Up" 4:03 
Monica featuring 112 – "Right Here Waiting" 4:15 
R.E.M. – "The Great Beyond" 4:13 
Sarah McLachlan – "I Will Remember You" 3:40

Certifications

References

Totally Hits
2000 compilation albums